Soy Ante Todo Mujer is the ninth (9th) studio album by Puerto Rican singer Yolandita Monge released in 1977 on LP, 8-Track and Cassette format.

The album was re-issued in 1990 by Musical Productions in CD format with a different cover picture and artwork.  Such re-issue is available as a digital download at Amazon, as well as several hits songs also appear in various compilations of the singer available on such media platforms.  Coco Records/Charly re-released the album in October 2020 as a digital download at iTunes and Amazon with the original LP artwork.

Track listing

Credits and personnel
Vocals: Yolandita Monge
Producer: Enrique Méndez
Arrangements & Recording Director: Raúl Parentella
Mastering: José Rodríguez
Recorded: Ion Recording Studios, Buenos Aires, Argentina, February 1977
Art Direction & Design: Hal. Wilson
Cover Photography: Cándido Ortiz
Backliner Photography: Dominique

Notes
Track listing and credits from album cover.
Re-released in CD Format by Musical Productions on 1990 (MP-3139CD) under license of The Note Records & Tapes, Inc.
Re-released digitally by Musical Productions on May 30, 2006.
Re-released digitally by Coco Records/Charly on October, 2020.

References

Yolandita Monge albums
1977 albums